John Stewart may refer to:

Business
 John Aikman Stewart (1822–1926), American banker
 John Stewart (financier) (1860–1938), Scottish-born Canadian financier and railway builder
 John Killough Stewart (1867–1938), businessman and philanthropist in Queensland, Australia
 John K. Stewart (1870–1916), American entrepreneur and inventor
 John Leighton Stewart (1876–1940), American newspaper publisher
 Sir John Stewart, 1st Baronet, of Fingask (1877–1924), Scottish whisky distiller
 John Stewart (businessman) (born 1949), British businessman

Entertainment
 Johnnie Stewart (1917–2005), British radio and TV producer, creator of Top of the Pops
 John Stewart (musician) (1939–2008), American singer-songwriter, member of The Kingston Trio
 John Stewart (tenor) (born 1940), American opera singer
 Jon Stewart (born 1962), American comedian, author, television host
 John Clarence Stewart (born 1988), American actor and singer

Military
 John Stewart (constable of Stirling Castle) (fl. 1576–1581), Scottish soldier
 Lord John Stewart (1621–1644), Scottish aristocrat who served as a Royalist commander in the English Civil War
 John Stewart (of Livingstone) (died 1726), Scottish army officer and MP for Kirkcudbright Stewartry, 1708–15
 John Roy Stewart (1700–1752), officer in the Jacobite army of 1745 and poet
 John Stewart (British Army officer, died 1796) (1709–1796), Scottish officer in the Dutch Army and MP for Anstruther Burghs
 J. D. H. Stewart (John Donald Hamill Stewart, 1845–1884), British Army officer, aide to General Gordon at Khartoum
 John Stewart of Ardvorlich (1904–1985), British Army officer and historian

Politics and government

United Kingdom
 John Stewart (Wigtownshire MP, died 1748), MP for Scotland in the first Parliament of Great Britain and later for Wigtownshire
 John Stewart (Wigtownshire MP, died 1769), of Castle Stewart, Scottish Member of Parliament for Wigtownshire
 John Stewart (Arundel MP) (1720s–1781), British Member of Parliament for Arundel
 John Stewart (Camelford MP) (1755–1826), West India planter and MP for Camelford
 Sir John Stewart, 1st Baronet, of Athenree (1758–1825), MP for Tyrone 1802–1806 and 1812–1825
 John Stewart (Beverley MP) (1784–1873), British Member of Parliament for Beverley
 John Stewart (Lymington MP) (1789–1860), British Member of Parliament for Lymington
 John Stewart (Glasgow politician) (1867–1947), Lord Provost of Glasgow
 John Stewart (diplomat) (1927–1995), British geologist, colonial administrator, first British ambassador to unified Vietnam
 Allan Stewart (politician) (John Allan Stewart, 1942–2016), Scottish Member of Parliament
 John Stewart (Northern Ireland politician) (born 1983), unionist politician

United States
 John Stewart (Pennsylvania politician) (died 1820), United States Representative from Pennsylvania
 John Stewart (Connecticut politician) (1795–1860), United States Representative from Connecticut
 John Wolcott Stewart (1825–1915), United States Senator from Vermont
 John D. Stewart (politician) (1833–1894), United States Representative from Georgia
 John Knox Stewart (1853–1919), United States Representative from New York
 J. George Stewart (1890–1970), United States Representative from Delaware and Architect of the Capitol
 John C. Stewart (born 1949), member of the Michigan House of Representatives

Canada, Australia and New Zealand
 John Stewart (Prince Edward Island politician) (–1834), Scottish-born army officer and politician
 John Stewart (New South Wales colonial politician) (1810–1896), New South Wales colonial MLA
 John Duncan Stewart (1839–1921), farmer and political figure in Saskatchewan
 John Alexander Stewart (politician) (1867–1922), Canadian Member of Parliament from Ontario
 John Stewart (Western Australian politician) (1868–1927), MLA in Western Australia
 John Stewart (New South Wales Labor politician) (1876–1957), New South Wales state MLC
 John Smith Stewart (1878–1970), Canadian Member of Parliament from Alberta
 John Stewart (New Zealand politician) (1902–1973), New Zealand politician
 John Benjamin Stewart (1924–2015), Canadian Member of Parliament from Nova Scotia
 John Stewart (Toronto politician), Reform Party of Canada candidate in the 1997 Canadian federal election

Royalty and aristocracy
 Sir John Stewart (knight, died 1298), son of Alexander, 4th High Steward of Scotland
 John Stewart, 1st Earl of Angus (died 1331), Scottish nobleman
 Robert III of Scotland (c. 1337–1406), who before he became king was known as John Stewart, Earl of Carrick
 Sir John Stewart of Darnley (c. 1380–1429), Scottish nobleman, Lord of Concressault, Aubigny, Count of Évreux
 John Stewart, Earl of Buchan (1381–1424), Constable of France
 John Stewart of Ralston (fl. 1436), Scottish nobleman, half-brother of King Robert II
 John Stewart, 3rd Lord of Aubigny (died 1482), Scottish and French nobleman, son of Sir John Stewart of Darnley
 John Stewart, 1st Earl of Lennox, (c. 1430–1495), Scottish nobleman
 John Stewart, 1st Earl of Atholl (c. 1440–1512), Scottish nobleman and ambassador to England, 1484
 John Stewart, Earl of Mar (died 1479) (c. 1456–c. 1479), youngest son of King James II of Scotland
 John Stewart, 2nd Earl of Atholl (c. 1475–c.1522), Scottish nobleman, son of the 1st Earl of Atholl
 John Stewart, Earl of Mar (died 1503) (c. 1479–1503), youngest son of King James III of Scotland, nephew of the Earl of Mar (died 1479)
 John Stewart, Duke of Albany (1481/1484–1536), regent of the Kingdom of Scotland, nephew of the Earl of Mar (died 1479)
 John Stewart, 3rd Earl of Lennox (c. 1490–1526), Scottish magnate, grandson of the 1st Earl of Lennox
 John Stewart, 3rd Earl of Buchan (c. 1498–c. 1551), Scottish nobleman
 John Stewart, 3rd Earl of Atholl (1507–1542), Scottish nobleman, son of the 2nd Earl of Atholl
 Sir John Stewart of Minto (1525–1583), provost of Glasgow
 John Stewart, Commendator of Coldingham (1531–1563), illegitimate son of King James V of Scotland
 John Stewart, 4th Earl of Atholl (died 1579), Scottish nobleman, son of the 3rd Earl of Atholl
 John Stewart, 5th Earl of Atholl (1563–1595), Scottish nobleman, son of the 4th Earl of Atholl
 John Stewart of Traquair (died 1591), Scottish landowner
 John Stewart, 1st Earl of Atholl (1566–1603), Scottish landowner
 Sir John Stewart of Methven (died 1628), governor of Dumbarton Castle and admiral of the Western Seas 
 John Stewart, 1st Earl of Traquair (died 1659), Scottish statesman
 John Stewart, Earl of Carrick (died c. 1645), Scottish nobleman, third son of Robert, Earl of Orkney
 John Stewart, 7th Earl of Galloway (1736–1806), Scottish peer
 John Stewart-Murray, 7th Duke of Atholl (1840–1917), Scottish peer
 John Stewart-Murray, 8th Duke of Atholl (1871–1942), Scottish soldier and Conservative politician

Science
 John Vandeleur Stewart (1804–1872), Irish naturalist, ornithologist
 John Stewart of Nateby Hall (1813–1867), Scottish naturalist
 John Tiffin Stewart (1827–1913), New Zealand civil engineer and surveyor
 John Lindsay Stewart (1831–1873), Scottish botanist
 John Quincy Stewart (1894–1972), American astrophysicist

Sports

Football and rugby
 John P. Stewart (fl. 1903–1906), American football coach
 Johnny Stewart (footballer, born 1872), English footballer
 John W. Stewart (American football) (1889–1943), American football, basketball, and track coach, college athletics administrator
 John Stewart (footballer, born 1914) (1914–?), Scottish footballer
 Jackie Stewart (footballer, born 1921) (1921–1990), Scottish footballer
 JJ Stewart (1923–2002), New Zealand rugby union coach
 Jackie Stewart (footballer, born 1929) (1929–2004), Scottish footballer
 John Stewart (footballer, born 1937), English footballer
 John Stewart (footballer, born 1948), English footballer who played for Dallas Tornado 1967–69
 John Stewart (footballer, born 1985), Scottish footballer
 Jonathan Stewart (born 1987), American football player
 John Stewart (rugby union) (born 1988), Fijian rugby union player
 Jonny Stewart (born 1990), Scottish footballer

Other sports
 John Stewart (cricketer) (fl. 1792–1797), English cricketer
 Stuffy Stewart (1894–1980), American baseball player
 Jack Stewart (ice hockey) (1917–1983), Canadian ice hockey player
 Sir Jackie Stewart (born 1939), Scottish racing driver
 John Stewart (ice hockey, born 1950), Canadian ice hockey player
 John Stewart (ice hockey, born 1954), Canadian ice hockey player

Other people
 John Stewart of Baldynneis (c. 1545–c. 1605), Scottish courtier and writer
 John Stewart (minister) (1743–1821), Scottish minister and Gaelic scholar
 Walking Stewart (John Stewart, 1747–1822), English traveller and philosopher
 John Stewart (missionary) (1786–1823), American Methodist missionary to the Wyandot Indians
 John Shaw Stewart (1793–1840), Scottish advocate and essayist
 John Alexander Stewart (philosopher) (1846–1933), Scottish writer, educator and philosopher
 John McKellar Stewart (1878–1953), professor of philosophy at the University of Adelaide
 John Alexander Stewart (scholar) (1882–1948), Scottish scholar of Burmese
 J. I. M. Stewart (1906–1994), Scottish novelist and critic
 John Stewart (bishop) (born 1940), Australian Anglican bishop
 John Stewart (campaigner) (born 1950), British environmental campaigner
 John Durie Stewart, assistant international commissioner of the Scout Association
 John Stewart (character), member of the Green Lantern Corps in the DC Universe

See also
 Jack Stewart (disambiguation)
 Jackie Stewart (disambiguation)
 John Stuart (disambiguation)
 Jon Stewart (disambiguation)